Misra or Mishra may refer to:
 Motor Industry Software Reliability Association
 MISRA C, a software development standard for the C programming language
 Misra (poetry), a term meaning a line of a couplet, or verse, in Turkic, Arabic, Persian and Urdu poetry
 Mishra, Indo-Nepalese surname
 Mishra (Magic: The Gathering), a character in The Brothers' War novel
 Bhagiratha (Mishras' ancestor)
 Misra Records, a record label
 A variation of the classical Arabic name for Egypt, 
 Misra (month), the Egyptian Arabic name for a month of the Coptic calendar
 Vishal Misra, American engineer

See also
 Mushaira, gathering of Urdu poets